Nikita Yuryevich Belykh (born June 13, 1975) is a Russian politician and former leader of the Union of Rightist Forces party. He was a member of the Legislative Assembly of Perm Krai until 2008, and the governor of Kirov Oblast from January 2009 until his arrest in July 2016.

Biography
Nikita Belykh was born on June 13, 1975. He graduated from Perm State University. In 1998 he became vice president of the Perm Financial-Industrial Group. In 2001 Belykh was first elected to the Legislative Assembly of the Perm Oblast, where he became chairman of the committee on economic policy and taxation.

In December 2003, Belykh was a parliamentary candidate for the Union of Right Forces, which failed to pass the nationwide 5% threshold required for entering the State Duma. In March 2004 he was appointed Deputy Governor of the Perm Oblast.

On May 28, 2005, Belykh was elected leader of the Union of Right Forces, a leading opposition party, succeeding Boris Nemtsov. He thereby resigned as Deputy Governor of the Perm Oblast. As party leader, Belykh adopted a line of strict opposition to Russian President Vladimir Putin and launched coalition talks with the Yabloko party.

As a result of the agreement between Belykh and Grigory Yavlinsky reached in October 2005, the Union of Right Forces and Yabloko formed a coalition, Yabloko-United Democrats, to contest the Moscow City Duma elections on December 4, 2005. The coalition won 11% of the vote and became one of only three parties (along with United Russia and the Communist Party) to enter the new Moscow legislature.

In December 2006 the Union of Right Forces received 16% of the vote in the regional legislative elections in Perm Krai. Belykh, who headed the party list, was elected to the Legislative Assembly.

In September 2008 Belykh announced that he had resigned from his position and left the Union of Right Forces in connection with its likely merger with a couple of pro-Kremlin parties.

On December 8, 2008, Belykh was nominated governor of Kirov Oblast after a personal meeting with Dmitry Medvedev. (From July 2009 till June 2011 Maria Gaidar was an official responsible for socio-economic development in the Kirov Oblast.)

Detention 
On June 24, 2016, Belykh was arrested in a bar by the Russian Investigative Committee, allegedly for receiving a bribe of €400,000. While under investigation he faced up to 15 years of jail time. He denied taking bribes or any other wrongdoing. According to Dmitry Peskov, Vladimir Putin was not consulted about making the arrest. Belykh was convicted of bribery in February 2018 and sentenced to eight years in prison, a 48.5 million ruble ($866,000) fine, and was barred from holding public office for three years.

References

External links
 
Belykh's blog

1975 births
Living people
Politicians from Perm, Russia
Perm State University alumni
Governors of Kirov Oblast
Echo of Moscow radio presenters
Union of Right Forces politicians
People convicted of bribery in Russia